Maurice Galand (August 23, 1930 – July 24, 2007) was a Canadian ice hockey player with the East York Lyndhursts. He won a silver medal at the 1954 World Ice Hockey Championships in Stockholm, Sweden. He previously played in the OHA for the Stratford Kroehlers, Oshawa Generals and Owen Sound Mercury's.

References

1930 births
2007 deaths
Canadian ice hockey right wingers
East York Lyndhursts players
Sportspeople from Scarborough, Toronto
Ice hockey people from Toronto